European Empire may refer to: 
in a historical context, the Colonial empires of the Early Modern period
in current usage, a term for the Eurosphere emphasizing a prediction of growing influence of Europe in the 21st century

See also
Pan-European nationalism
:Category:Former empires in Europe